Iftikar Thakur (Urdu), born Iftikhar Ahmed is a Pakistani actor and stand up comedian. He rose to fame for his roles in Punjabi drama. 

He has starred in numerous stage shows and telefilms in different languages including Punjabi/Pothwari and Urdu. He currently stars in the comedy talk show Mazaaq Raat, where he portrays Mian Afzal Nirgoli, a Punjab Police officer. 

In September 2015, Thakur protested India's 28 August cease-fire violation, by filing a court petition to permanently ban Indian films from Pakistani cinemas.  The petition was dismissed, with the court explaining that the Ministry of Culture would be the correct agency to petition.

Early life
Thakur was born in Mian Channu, Pakistan on April 1, 1958. Prior to becoming an actor, he worked in an auto repair facility fixing punctured tires.

Education
Thakur completed his Intermediate from Commerce College Karachi. After jumping into the stage and film world, in 1997 he went to  the United States of America for polishing his back end in acting and direction and got his 3 years and 2 months training certificate from New York Film academy.

Career
Thakur started his career from Pakistan Theatre. He adopted the name Iftikhar Thakur based on a character he played in stage dramas.

Television

Film

Awards and recognition
Pride of Performance Award by the President of Pakistan in 2019

References

External links
 
Iftikhar Thakur on You Tube - Archived

Living people
Pakistani male film actors
Pakistani male television actors
Pakistani male stage actors
Punjabi people
1958 births
 Recipients of the Pride of Performance